NGC 377 is a spiral galaxy located in the constellation Cetus. It was discovered on October 15, 1885 by Francis Leavenworth. It was described by Dreyer as "very faint, very small, much extended, suddenly brighter middle and nucleus."

References

Spiral galaxies
0377
18851015
Cetus (constellation)
003931